Lastres, in Asturian and officially named Llastres, is one of 13 parishes (administrative divisions) in the Colunga municipality, within the province and autonomous community of Asturias, in northern Spain.

The population is 1,159 (INE 2004).

Heritage
Santa María de Sabada Church
Declared as Bien de Interés Cultural, it was built in the 18th century. The tower was added at the end of the 19th century.
Capilla de San Roque
It is located in the heights of the village. It also has a balcony for watching a panoramical view of the village and its port.

Recent history
Between 2009 and 2011 Doctor Mateo, a comedy drama produced for Antena 3 was filmed in the town. Llastres was called in it San Martín del Sella.

In 2010, Llastres received a Prince of Asturias Award, as the exemplary Asturian town of the year.

Gallery

References

External links

 Official website 

Parishes in Colunga